Dennis Wayne Byrd (August 31, 1946 – July 22, 2010) was one of the most dominant defensive tackles in the Atlantic Coast Conference history earning first-team All-ACC honors in each of his three years of varsity competition at North Carolina State University and was a consensus first-team All-American as a Senior in 1967.

College Career at NC State
Byrd made several first-team All-America lists as a Junior in 1966 and was a consensus first-team All-American as a Senior in 1967. He was the first player from NC State to become a consensus First-team All-American and was the first three-time All-ACC player in conference history.

Professional career
Byrd was drafted sixth overall in the first round of the 1968 NFL Draft by the Boston Patriots. Byrd started all 14 games for the 1968 Patriots team, but he was never able to fully recover from a knee injury he suffered in his senior year at NC State and only played one year in the NFL.

After leaving the NFL, Byrd became the high school football coach at West Lincoln High School in Lincolnton, North Carolina, and later was an assistant high school football coach at Northeastern High School in Elizabeth City, North Carolina. He retired from teaching and coaching in 2004.

Honors
In 2001, Byrd became the first defensive player at NC State to have his jersey number (77) retired. 
He was selected to the ACC 50th Anniversary Football Team in 2003. 
Byrd was inducted into the North Carolina Sports Hall of Fame in 2007 and was inducted into the College Football Hall of Fame in 2010. 
In 2014, he was inducted into the NC State Athletic Hall of Fame.

References

1946 births
2010 deaths
All-American college football players
American football defensive ends
American football defensive tackles
Boston Patriots players
College Football Hall of Fame inductees
NC State Wolfpack football players
American Football League players
People from Pleasant Garden, North Carolina
Players of American football from North Carolina